Maksim Tank Belarusian State Pedagogical University also known as BSPU is a university in Minsk, Belarus. It specialises in teacher training of mathematics, chemistry, physics, psychology, geography, history, languages and others for primary and secondary schools.

History
Minsk State Pedagogical University (first name - Minsk Teachers Institute) admitted his first students in 1914.
For a long period the institution was reorganised into a pedagogical department of Belarusian State University. After being a part of another university for ten years the Decree of the Ministry of People's Commissars of the BSSR proclaimed the Pedagogical Department of Belarusian State University an independent Belarusian State Pedagogical higher institution named after the Soviet author Maxim Gorky in 1936.

In 1993 after Belarus achieved its independence and in frames of the policy of the development of sovereign educational system the institute got a status of the university. Two years later the university was renamed after the Belarusian Soviet poet Maksim Tank. Since 2007 the university is a member of the Eurasian Association of Universities.

Structure

Departments
There are 12 departments (and a number of subdepartments) within the university structure:
Department of History
Physics and Mathematics Department
Pre-university Training Department
Department of Pre-school Education
Natural Science Department
Physical Education Department
Primary Education Department
Psychology Department
Philology Department
Social Education Department
Social-Pedagogical Technologies Department
Aesthetical Education Department

Notable alumni
 Uladzimir Nyaklyayew
 Uladzimir Sodal
 Alhierd Baharevich
 Tatsiana Karatkevich

References

Universities in Minsk